Sports memorabilia refers to collectables associated with sports. Types include equipment, trophies, sports cards, autographs, photographs, etc.

A multi-billion-dollar industry has grown up around the trading of sports memorabilia. Individual items can be valued in the millions of dollars. For example, a T206 Honus Wagner baseball card was sold for $2.8 million in 2007. As a result, fakes have become a serious problem.

Monetary value
Items that have been in direct contact with a famous athlete can have significant monetary value. Game-used items such as the ball, which Mark McGwire hit for his 70th home run of the 1998 season, sold for $3 million. The most expensive piece of sports memorabilia ever sold, a New York Yankees baseball jersey worn by Babe Ruth during the 1920 season, sold for $4,415,658 in 2012. In 2016, the ten most valuable sports cards and memorabilia sold for a record-setting combined $12,186,294.

Autographed pieces of memorabilia are usually more valuable than non-autographed items. Items that have been personalized (i.e. "To Mark," Best Wishes Travis," or "Happy Birthday John") can add sentimental value. Collectors who are interested in purchasing sports memorabilia often look for a certificate of authenticity. Several companies have developed systems to prove the authenticity of game-used or autographed memorabilia, and collectors will generally seek out dealers that offer a lifetime, money-back, authenticity guarantee.

The value of a signed item will generally be relative to the profile of the signer and the scarcity of similar items. When a high-profile sports star dies, the value often rises as there will no longer be an opportunity to get more. For example, the death of Muhammad Ali in 2016 raised both demand and prices for signed Muhammad Ali memorabilia.

History

It could be said that collecting sports memorabilia goes back to the first decades of the 20th century, when many people would collect baseballs from baseball games and many asked Babe Ruth for autographs. As years passed and many other sports stars joined their sports, memorabilia collectors also began to broaden their horizons.

When the NBA, MLB, NHL and NFL began selling their jerseys in stores during the 1980s, game used jerseys also became a hot item among sports memorabilia collectors. Former NBA player Dennis Rodman was famous for taking off his jerseys and throwing them to the stands after his games were over. Michael Jordan is probably the basketball player whose memorabilia is most sought after by collectors.

The highest price fetched for a football (soccer) match worn shirt is $224,000.  The shirt belonged to the legendary Pelé, who wore it during the 1970 World Cup final in which Brazil went on to win.

Popular items

Collectors like to look back in time when they are finding sports memorabilia. Items such as John L. Sullivan and Jack Johnson fight posters have sold well before. There is also a boxing glove signed by Sullivan, Johnson, Ruth and many Hollywood stars and American Presidents that has sold for a lot of money before. This glove is now on display at the International Boxing Hall of Fame.

Other popular items in sports memorabilia are "game-used" items.  Game used can refer to an item worn on the field during a game, worn during the pregame, or by a player on the bench.  These can include jerseys, pants, caps, helmets, gloves, shoes, or even sunglasses.  Game Used can also refer to bats, balls, turf, flags, or other items used by a player on in the stadium.  In NASCAR, and other forms of automobile racing, the metal from the cars, the tires, the driver uniforms, and the crew uniforms are popular collectables. Concrete from the various racetracks are also popular. Trunks (shorts or pants), used by popular boxers such as Greg Haugen in boxing fights are also popular and sometimes sell for 100 dollars or more.

In Europe, football (soccer) memorabilia is the largest market, with high-profile players shirts, boots and photos in demand. Event programmes from rugby union and football (soccer) matches are also highly collectable.

Many stadiums will occasionally offer bobble heads, statues that feature a caricature-like head that bounces through the use of a spring, to their fans during games. Bobble heads usually feature an athlete in a standing position but may also feature them throwing, kicking, or hitting a sports ball.

References

External links

 
Sports culture